FC Ryazan, formerly FC Zvezda Ryazan or FC Star Ryazan, is an association football club from Ryazan, Russia, founded in 2010 after the previous FC Ryazan was dissolved. It plays in the Russian Second Division.

The team was originally named FC Zvezda Ryazan, but was renamed to FC Ryazan before the 2014–15 season.

Current squad
As of 21 February 2023, according to the Second League website.

Coaches
 Rizvan Tarasov
 Evgeny Kochargin
 Igor Mythrenko
 Oleg Lobanov

External links
Profile on 2liga.ru 

Association football clubs established in 2010
Football clubs in Russia
Sport in Ryazan
2010 establishments in Russia